The 2006 Grand Prix Hassan II was a men's Association of Tennis Professionals tennis tournament held in Casablanca, Morocco. It was the 22nd edition of the tournament and was held from 24 April until 1 May 2006. Seventh-seeded Daniele Bracciali won the singles title.

Finals

Singles

 Daniele Bracciali defeated  Nicolás Massú 6–1, 6–4
 It was Bracciali's only title of the year and the 2nd of his career.

Doubles

 Julian Knowle /  Jürgen Melzer defeated  Michael Kohlmann /  Alexander Waske 6–3, 6–4
 It was Knowle's only title of the year and the 7th of his career. It was Melzer's 1st title of the year and the 2nd of his career.

External links
 Singles draw
 Doubles draw

 
Grand Prix Hassan II
Grand Prix Hassan II